Leptospermum amboinense is a species of tree that is native to Malesia and North Queensland. It has rough bark, sessile, narrow elliptical leaves, white flowers and sessile, conical to hemispherical fruit.

Description
It has rough, grey to brown fibrous bark on the trunk and branches. New growth is bronze-coloured. The flowers are borne singly, sometimes in groups of up to four, on side branches.

Taxonomy and naming
Leptospermum amboinense was first formally described in 1826 by Carl Ludwig Blume who published the description in
his book Bijdragen tot de flora van Nederlandsch Indië .

Distribution and habitat
This leptospermum is native to Malesia and to North Queensland. In Malesia it is found in Malaya, Sumatra, Borneo, Sulawesi, the Moluccas, Florea and the Philippines. Herbarium records suggest that in grows at lower altitudes than the similar L. javanicum. In Queensland it occurs in coastal areas between Cooktown and Bowen.

Conservation status
This species is classified as of "least concern" under the Queensland Government Nature Conservation Act 1992.

Use in horticulture
It is hardy in the tropics and subtropical areas and can be propagated from seed or cuttings.

References

External links
GBIF: Leptospermum amboinense occurrence data
 Images of Leptospermum amboinense.

amboinense
Flora of Malesia
Myrtales of Australia
Flora of New South Wales
Flora of Queensland
Plants described in 1826